The 1951 Rutgers Queensmen football team represented Rutgers University in the 1951 college football season. In their 10th season under head coach Harvey Harman, the Queensemen compiled a 4–4 record and outscored their opponents 184 to 114.

Schedule

References

Rutgers
Rutgers Scarlet Knights football seasons
Rutgers Queensmen football